Wang-an Airport  is an airport in Wang-an, Penghu Islands, Taiwan (ROC).

History
Construction of the airport started in January 1988, and was finished later that year. On 11 May 1991 the Civil Aeronautics Administration began to manage the airport, and the airport now has an auxiliary status. The runway was resurfaced in 1996.

Airlines and destinations

Statistics

See also
 Civil Aeronautics Administration (Taiwan)
 Transportation in Taiwan
 List of airports in Taiwan

References

External links

Wang'an Airport (in English)

1948 establishments in Taiwan
Airports in Penghu County